Monika Ewa Michalik (born 2 May 1980 in Międzyrzecz) is a freestyle wrestler from Poland. She participated in Women's freestyle 63 kg at 2008 Summer Olympics. In the last 16, she beat Volha Khilko from Belarus. In the quarter-finals Michalik lost to the French wrestler Lise Golliot-Legrand.

At the 2012 Summer Olympics, Michalik once again reached the quarter-finals, losing to eventual silver medallist Jing Ruixue of China.

At the 2016 Summer Olympics, she won the bronze medal defeating Inna Trazhukova of Russia.

Her brother Tadeusz is also a wrestler. He won a bronze medal at the 2020 Summer Olympics in Tokyo.

References

External links
 Athlete bio on beijing2008.com
 FILA
 Profile at FILA Wrestling Database
 Polish Wrestling Federation
 Orleta Trzciel

Living people
1980 births
Polish female sport wrestlers
Wrestlers at the 2008 Summer Olympics
Wrestlers at the 2012 Summer Olympics
Wrestlers at the 2016 Summer Olympics
Olympic wrestlers of Poland
People from Międzyrzecz
Sportspeople from Lubusz Voivodeship
European Games competitors for Poland
World Wrestling Championships medalists
Olympic bronze medalists for Poland
Olympic medalists in wrestling
Medalists at the 2016 Summer Olympics
European Wrestling Championships medalists
21st-century Polish women